Linares is a parish (administrative division) in Allande, a municipality within the province and autonomous community of Asturias, in northern Spain.

The population is 71.

Villages and hamlets
Arganzúa
La Ponte Ḷḷinares
Ḷḷinares

David Bomberg
The famous artist David Bomberg lived in Linares from July to October 1935, during this period he painted one of his most celebrated landscapes: "The valley of La Hermida, Picos de Europa"

References

External links
 Allande 

Parishes in Allande